James A. Horn (born August 31, 1930) is an American politician who served as a member of the Washington State Senate, representing the 41st district from 1997 to 2005. A member of the Republican Party, he previously served as a member of the Washington House of Representatives from 1989 to 1997.

Personal life 
Horn's wife is Joyce Horn. They have two children. Horn and his family live in Mercer Island, Washington.

References

External links 
 Jim Horn at ourcampaigns.com

1930 births
Living people
Republican Party members of the Washington House of Representatives
Republican Party Washington (state) state senators
People from Mercer Island, Washington
20th-century American politicians
21st-century American politicians